Konstanty Troczyński (born 9 December 1906 in Częstochowa - 1942 in Auschwitz) was a Polish literature theoretician and critic.

Troczyński worked at the Adam Mickiewicz University in Poznań. During the Second World War and the German occupation of Poland he taught at the so-called "Secret Universities" in Kraków. He was arrested by the Gestapo and murdered in the German concentration camp Auschwitz.

Works
 Od formizmu do moralizmu (1935)
 Artysta i dzieło (1938)

1906 births
1942 deaths
Polish resistance members of World War II
Polish male writers
Polish civilians killed in World War II
Polish people who died in Auschwitz concentration camp
People from Częstochowa
Resistance members who died in Nazi concentration camps